Pinkove Zvezdice is a Serbian singing contest on the RTV Pink television channel. The first episode was broadcast in September 2014.

References

2014 establishments in Serbia
RTV Pink original programming
Talent shows
Singing talent shows